The 2022 Ole Miss Rebels softball team represents the University of Mississippi in the 2022 NCAA Division I softball season. The Rebels play their home games at the Ole Miss Softball Complex.

Previous season

The Rebels finished the 2021 season 36–22 overall, and 12–12 in the SEC to finish in eighth place in the conference. They were invited to the Tucson Regional where they finished 2–2.

Schedule and results

Roster

See also
2022 Ole Miss Rebels baseball team

References

Ole Miss
Ole Miss Rebels softball seasons
Ole Miss Rebels softball